August Peterson Alberts (September 1860 – May 7, 1912) was an American infielder in Major League Baseball from 1884 to 1891. He played for the Pittsburgh Alleghenys (1884), Cleveland Blues (1888), and the Milwaukee Brewers (1891) of the American Association and very briefly for the Washington Nationals of the Union Association (1884). Alberts threw and batted right-handed. He was 5'6 ½" and 180 lbs.

In 120 games he batted .197 (84-for-426) and scored 62 runs. An average third baseman and shortstop for the times, he had a fielding percentage of .867. Of the 120 appearances, 102 of those games were with the Cleveland Blues in 1888. With them, he had a .206 batting average and 26 stolen bases.

Alberts was born in Reading, Pennsylvania. He died suddenly at the age of 52 near the Brunswick Flats area in Idaho Springs, Colorado. He had resided in Alice, Idaho, when he suddenly became ill with pneumonia and was taken to Idaho Springs to recuperate. Alberts ventured onto the streets just an hour before dying and was ordered to return inside by a physician.  He worked in the mines known as the Chesapeake group which were located between Alice and St. Mary. He was employed by the Clara Exploration and Development Company.  He was interred at Mount Olivet Cemetery in Wheat Ridge, Colorado.

References

The Idaho Springs Siftings-News, Idaho Springs, Colorado, Saturday, May 11, 1912
The 1996 MacMillan Baseball Encyclopedia Digital Edition

External links

19th-century baseball players
Major League Baseball infielders
Pittsburgh Alleghenys players
Washington Nationals (UA) players
Cleveland Spiders players
Milwaukee Brewers (AA) players
Baseball players from Pennsylvania
Sportspeople from Reading, Pennsylvania
Wilmington Quicksteps (minor league) players
Allentown Dukes players
Reading Actives players
Albany Senators players
Binghamton Bingoes players
Toronto Canucks players
Houston Babies players
Houston Red Stockings players
Milwaukee Brewers (minor league) players
Milwaukee Creams players
Kansas City Cowboys (minor league) players
Oshkosh Indians players
Rockford Reds players
St. Joseph Saints players
1860 births
1912 deaths